Northumberland Park is a Tyne and Wear Metro and future National Rail station, serving the village of Backworth and suburbs of Northumberland Park and West Allotment, North Tyneside in Tyne and Wear, England. It joined the network on 11 December 2005, and is the second-newest station on the network as of March 2022.

History
The station is located to the west of the site of the former Backworth station, which closed to passengers on 13 June 1977. The station was indirectly replaced by the nearby Shiremoor, which was purpose-built for the network, and opened on 10 August 1980.

Northumberland Park is located a short walk away from the nearby Cobalt Business Park, which can be also reached using Go North East's 19 bus. This route also serves Silverlink Retail Park, Royal Quays and the Shields Ferry.

The station was used by 311,714 passengers in 2017–18, making it the fifth-least-used station in North Tyneside.

Facilities 
Step-free access is available at all stations across the Tyne and Wear Metro network, with a lift providing step-free access to the island platform at Northumberland Park. The station is equipped with ticket machines, sheltered waiting area, seating, next train information displays, timetable posters, and an emergency help point. Ticket machines are able to accept payment with credit and debit card (including contactless payment), notes and coins. The station is also fitted with smartcard validators, which feature at all stations across the network.

The station serves as a park and ride, and is served by a multi-storey car park with 393 spaces, plus 12 accessible spaces. There is also the provision for cycle parking, with five cycle lockers and five cycle pods available for use. A small bus interchange is also available at the station, providing frequent connections in and around North Tyneside and south east Northumberland.

Services 
, the station is served by up to five trains per hour on weekdays and Saturday, and up to four trains per hour during the evening and on Sunday.

Rolling stock used: Class 599 Metrocar

Future developments

The proposed passenger service would utilise the existing single-track freight line which parallels the Metro's Yellow Line between Benton Junction and the site of Backworth Junction, just to the east of Northumberland Park station. It is anticipated that a new National Rail platform will be added adjacent to the current Metro station to create an interchange.

A planning application for the new National Rail station was submitted to North Tyneside Borough Council on 2 February 2021. The submitted planning documents indicate that the station will have a single platform, located on the north side of Network Rail track, which is designed to accommodate a four-car train. It will be provided with two waiting shelters and, like the Metro station, it will be accessed from Algernon Drive via stairs and a lift. Approval for the new station was granted on 17 September 2021.

Northumberland Park's new National Rail station will be constructed by the project's primary construction contractor, Morgan Sindall.  It is anticipated that the main construction phase could begin in early 2022, enabling an opening date in 2024.

References

Sources

External links
 
 Timetable and station information for Northumberland Park

Metropolitan Borough of North Tyneside
2005 establishments in England
Railway stations in Great Britain opened in 2005
Tyne and Wear Metro Yellow line stations
Transport in Tyne and Wear
